Cashier Wants to Go to the Seaside is a 2000 Croatian comedy film directed by Dalibor Matanić.

Cast 

 Dora Polić as Barica
 Ivan Brkić as Miljenko
 Milan Štrljić as Police Detective
 Nina Violić as Jadranka
 Vera Zima as Štefica
 Hana Hegedušić as Željka
 Mirjana Rogina as Đurđa
 Danko Ljuština as Đurđa's Husband
 Anita Diaz as Tonka
 Marija Kohn as Old Thieving Lady
 Vlasta Knezović as Miljenko's Wife
 Branko Meničanin as Menial Worker
 Vlatko Dulić as Professor
 Drago Diklić as Himself

External links

 Blagajnica hoće ići na more at filmskiprogrami.hr 

2000 films
2000s Croatian-language films
Films directed by Dalibor Matanić
Films set in Zagreb
Croatian drama films
2000 directorial debut films
2000 drama films